Graham Chadwick (born 8 April 1942) is an English former footballer who played as a wing half for three clubs in The Football League.

Chadwick began his career with Manchester City, progressing from the youth set-up to make 12 league appearances before leaving for Walsall in 1964. After a year with the Saddlers, Chadwick moved to Chester, where 12 league outings were enjoyed before dropping into Non-league football with New Brighton. Captained Stafford Rangers to a treble of Northern Premier League, FA Trophy and Staffordshire Senior Cup in 1971/72 before joining Nantwich in the summer of 1974.

References

1942 births
Living people
English Football League players
Association football midfielders
English footballers
Footballers from Oldham
Chester City F.C. players
Manchester City F.C. players
New Brighton A.F.C. players
Walsall F.C. players